Delton may refer to:



Places
 Delton, Edmonton, a neighborhood in north-central Edmonton, Alberta, Canada

United States
 Delton, Michigan, a census-designated place in Barry Township
 Delton, Wisconsin, a town in Sauk County
 Delton Township, Cottonwood County, Minnesota
 Lake Delton, Wisconsin, a city

Other uses
 Delton AG, a large German holding company

See also
 
 Deltona, Florida